Salvatore "Sam" Valentine (October 13, 1934 – January 13, 1985) was an American football player.  He played college football at the guard position for the Penn State Nittany Lions football team from 1954 to 1956 and was captain of the 1956 team.  He was selected by the Football Writers Association of America and the Central Press Association as a first-team player on their respective 1956 College Football All-America Teams, and received second-team honors from the Associated Press and United Press.  In February 1957, he was named Pennsylvania's football athlete of the year.

References

1934 births
1985 deaths
American football guards
Penn State Nittany Lions football players
Players of American football from Pennsylvania
People from Jefferson County, Pennsylvania